Milman may refer to:

People with the surname 
 Adolf Milman (1886–1930), Russian and French painter
 David Milman (1912–1982), mathematician
 Dov Milman (1919–2007), Israeli politician and diplomat
 Sir Francis Milman, 1st Baronet (1746–1821), British physician
 Henry Hart Milman (1791–1868), English historian, son of Francis
 Mark Milman (1910–1995), Soviet pianist and composer
 Pierre Milman, mathematician
 Sophie Milman (born 1983), jazz vocalist
 Vitali Milman (born 1939), mathematician

Places 
 Milman, Iran
 Milman, Queensland, Australia
 Milman Islet, an island off the coast of Queensland, Australia

Other uses 
 Milman baronets, a British title

See also 
 Krein–Milman theorem